The following lists events that happened during 1977 in Greece.

Incumbents
 President – Konstantinos Tsatsos
 Prime Minister – Konstantinos Karamanlis

Events

 November – 1977 Greek legislative election
 Jewish Museum of Greece established

Births

 27 March – Ioannis Melissanidis, artistic gymnast
 31 March – Maria Sansaridou, rhythmic gymnast
 26 December – Sofia Bekatorou, sailor

Deaths 
 16 September - Maria Callas, soprano (born 1923 in the United States)

References

 
Years of the 20th century in Greece
Greece
1970s in Greece
Greece